Occombe Valley Woods is a Local Nature Reserve near Paignton in Devon. It is an ancient woodland owned by Torbay Borough Council, and managed by the Torbay Coast and Countryside Trust.

References

Local Nature Reserves in Devon
Torbay